Drury inlet is an inlet in the Queen Charlotte Strait region of the Central Coast of British Columbia, Canada, extending west from Wells Passage to the northwest of North Broughton Island, northwest of the town of Port Hardy.    Branching off to the northeast from the north side of the head of the inlet is Actaeon Sound.

Compton Point is the tip of a peninsula of the mainland, on the outside of which is located Blunden Harbour, some distance to the west from the south entrance of Wells Passage and is itself at the entry to another series of inlets (Belize Inlet, Seymour Inlet and others).

Bughouse Lake is immediately north of it away from the shore at  

Dove Island sits in the middle of the opening, on the Drury Inlet side. It comprises Dove Island Indian Reserve No. 12, 8.1 ha., which is under the administration of the Gwawaenuk Tribe band government of the Kwakwaka'wakw group of peoples. It is believed to have been named for His Majesty's gunboat Dove, commanded by Lieut. Cdr James Bullock, which was deployed as tender to HMS Actaeon in the East Indies and Chinese waters in later years.

Name origin
Drury had succeeded Commander James Wood, upon that ship's termination of her commission to the Pacific Station, from where she was sent to the Australia station. Other places around Drury Inlet are named for officers who served on the Pandora are Mount Kerr, for Thomas Kerr, Mount Jolliffe, for surgeon John Jolliffe and Pandora Head, for the vessel itself. The Bond Peninsula and Bond Lagoon on the south side of Actaeon Sound may also have been named in association with the Actaeon.

See also
Drury (disambiguation)

References

Inlets of British Columbia
Central Coast of British Columbia